The Dover Road may refer to:

 The Dover Road (play), a play by A.A. Milne
 The Dover Road (film), a 1934 American film adaptation